The 144th Fighter Wing (144 FW) is a unit of the California Air National Guard, stationed at Fresno Air National Guard Base, California. As part of the Air Reserve Component of the United States Air Force, the wing is operationally gained by the Air Combat Command.

Mission
The 144th Fighter Wing's primary federal mission under Title 10 USC is to provide air defense protection for California and the United States from the Mexican border to Oregon utilizing the F-15 Eagle jet fighter aircraft. In its state mission under Title 32 USC, the 144th also supports the nation's Counter Drug Program and responds to state emergencies when requested by the Governor of California.

The wing previously flew the F-16C and F-16D Fighting Falcon, having transferred the last F-16C aircraft to the Arizona Air National Guard in November 2013. The wing's current inventory of aircraft includes 21 F-15Cs and F-15Ds and consists of 18 Primary Aircraft Authorized (PAA) and 3 Backup Aircraft Inventory (BAI) that were previously assigned to the Montana Air National Guard, Missouri Air National Guard and Nellis Air Force Base. The wing also operates one C-26A transport.

Units
The 144th Fighter Wing is composed of the following units:
 144th Operations Group
 194th Fighter Squadron
 144th Maintenance Group
 144th Mission Support Group
 144th Medical Group.

History

World War II
Activated in October 1943 as the 372nd Fighter Group at Hamilton Field, California. During World War II, the squadron was an Operational Training Unit (OTU), equipped with second-line P-39 Airacobras and P-40 Warhawks. Its mission was to train newly graduated pilots from Training Command in combat tactics and maneuvers before being assigned to their permanent combat unit. Initially assigned to IV Fighter Command, then transferred to III Fighter Command in 1944, being re-equipped with P-51D Mustangs. It took part in air-ground maneuvers and demonstrations, participating in the Louisiana Maneuvers in the summer of 1944 and in similar activities in the US until after V-J Day.

Inactivated in November 1945.

California Air National Guard

The wartime 372nd Fighter Group was re-activated and re-designated as the 144th Fighter Group, and was allotted to the California Air National Guard, on 24 May 1946. It was organized at Naval Air Station Alameda, California, and was extended federal recognition on 2 June 1948 by the National Guard Bureau. The 144th Fighter Group was bestowed the lineage, history, honors, and colors of the 372nd Fighter Group and all predecessor units. The Group was assigned to the California ANG's 61st Fighter Wing.

Upon activation, operational squadrons of the 144th Fighter Group were:
 191st Fighter Squadron, Utah Air National Guard, Salt Lake City Municipal Airport, Salt Lake City, Utah
 192nd Fighter Squadron, Nevada Air National Guard, Hubbard Field, Las Vegas, Nevada
 194th Fighter Squadron, California Air National Guard, Naval Air Station Alameda, California,

The three squadrons were all re-designations of the 372nd Fighter Group's operational squadrons during World War II. All were initially equipped with F-51D Mustangs, with a mission of air defense of their respective states.

144th Fighter Wing
In 1949, the 144th and its assigned 194th Fighter Squadron moved from NAS Alameda to the former Hayward Army Airfield, designated as Hayward Air National Guard Base. At the end of October 1950, the Air National Guard converted to the wing-base (Hobson Plan) organization. As a result, the 61st Fighter Wing was withdrawn from the California ANG and inactivated on 31 October 1950. The 144th Fighter Wing was established by the National Guard Bureau, allocated to the state of California, recognized and activated 1 November 1950, assuming the personnel, equipment and mission of the inactivated 61st Fighter Wing. The 144th Fighter Group was assigned to the new wing as its operational group with the three fighter squadrons.

Air Defense Mission

With the surprise invasion of South Korea on 25 June 1950, and the tactical air forces lack of readiness due to postwar force reductions and greater emphasis on the Strategic Air Command nuclear mission in the active Air Force, most of the Air National Guard was federalized and placed on active duty. The squadrons of the 144th Fighter Group were retained by the Air National Guard and not deployed, however numerous pilots from all three of the group's squadrons volunteered for combat duty. The F-51Ds were exchanged for F-51H Mustangs in 1951, as the "D" model of the Mustang was needed for close air support missions in Korea. The F-51H was a Very Long Range version of the Mustang, which was developed to escort B-29 Superfortress bombers to Japan, but not considered rugged enough to be used in Korea. The increased range, however, was well-suited for air defense interceptor alert flights. During its years with the P-51H, the unit earned prominence as one of the Air Force's most respected aerial gunnery competitors. In June 1953, while still flying the Mustang, the unit qualified for the first all-jet, worldwide gunnery meet. Using borrowed F-86A Sabre jets, the 144th, which

With the increased availability of jet aircraft after the Korean War, the squadron's aircraft were upgraded from the piston-engine, propeller driven F-51H to its first jet aircraft, the F-86A Sabre Day Interceptor in 1954. At the same time, the 194th relocated to Fresno Air Terminal, followed by the wing in 1957. On 7 July 1955, the 144th was re-designated as the 194th Fighter-Interceptor Wing, a designation kept by the squadron for the next 37 years. With the F-86A, the 144th began standing dusk-to-dawn alerts, joining its active duty Air Defense Command (ADC) counterparts, with ADC operationally gaining the 144th within the active U.S. Air Force under Title 10 USC.

The 194th continued to fly the F-86A until 31 March 1958. On 1 April 1958, the transition was made to the F-86L Sabre Interceptor, which was designed from the onset as an interceptor, had all-weather capability and was able to be used in all weather. In addition, the F-86L could be controlled and directed by the SAGE computer-controlled Ground Control Interceptor (Radar) sites which would vector the aircraft to the unidentified target for interception.

In 1958, the Nevada and Utah Air National Guard were authorized to expand to a Group level. The 152nd Fighter-Interceptor Group, Nevada ANG, was federally recognized on 19 April 1958; the 151st Fighter-Interceptor Group, Utah ANG, on 1 July 1958. With Nevada and Utah forming their own command and control structure, command and control of the 191st and 192nd FIS were transferred to their state organizations.

On 1 July 1964, the 194th began flying the F-102A Delta Dagger, a Mach 1.25 supersonic interceptor. In January 1968, Air Defense Command was renamed Aerospace Defense Command, and continued to maintain operational responsibility. On 25 July 1974, the 194th retired the F-102 and brought the improved F-106 Delta Dart into service, continuing to fly this aircraft until 31 December 1983. On 1 October 1978 Aerospace Defense Command was inactivated, its units being reassigned to Air Defense, Tactical Air Command (ADTAC), a sub-element of Tactical Air Command (TAC), with ADTAC being established as compatible to a Numbered Air Force under TAC. TAC later replaced the aging F-106s on 1 January 1984 with F-4D Phantom IIs for use in the air defense interceptor mission. On 6 December 1985, ADTAC was disestablished and its role and responsibilities assumed by the reestablished First Air Force, a TAC organization which assumed operational oversight for all Air National Guard fighter units assigned to the air defense role.

Modern era
The 144th Fighter-Interceptor Wing received their first F-16A Fighting Falcons in October 1989. These were of the block 15 type, replacing the F-4D in the air defense and attack roles. The block 15 aircraft were not ideally suited to the squadron's dedicated air defense mission. This was remedied when the aircraft received the Air Defense Fighter (ADF) upgrade in 1990.

Effective 16 March 1992, the 144th Fighter-Interceptor Wing was re-designated as the 144th Fighter Wing (144 FW), with all related Fighter Interceptor Groups and Squadrons becoming Fighter Groups and Fighter Squadrons. On 1 June 1992, following the disestablishment of Tactical Air Command (TAC), the 144 FW was reassigned to the newly established Air Combat Command (ACC) under First Air Force.

During this time the 194th Fighter Squadron also had an alert detachment at George AFB in Victorville, California. George AFB was closed in 1992 due to BRAC action as part of the overall downsizing of the US military after the Cold War and the alert detachment moved to March Air Force Base, since renamed as March Air Reserve Base due to a later BRAC action. In 1995, the squadron transitioned to the more capable F-16C Fighting Falcon Block 25 aircraft.

The 144th Fighter Wing was the busiest dedicated air defense wing in the country during 1999, with deployments to eight countries and more than a half-dozen states. Combat training had many highlights throughout the year. Fifty wing members deployed five F-16s to Naval Air Station Fallon, Nevada, to participate in the Navy's annual joint combat training exercise. Members of the unit also traveled to Tyndall AFB, Florida for Combat Archer which provided an opportunity for live fire weapons training. To top off the year, six dozen members and six aircraft deployed to Nellis AFB, Nevada between 24 October and 7 November for Red Flag. During the opening minutes of the exercise, a 144th Fighter Wing four-ship flight executed a simulated kill against four actual MiG-29s. These were the first-ever MiG-29 kills in a Red Flag exercise.

Also in 1999, the 144th Civil Engineering Squadron's Fire Department deployed to Sheppard AFB, Texas for training, and 44 members of the 144th Services Flight trained at Tyndall AFB, Florida. Fifty-five members of the 144th Medical Squadron received medical readiness training at Alpena Combat Readiness Training Center, Michigan.

As the F-16 Block 25 aircraft came to the end of their operational lifespan, the 194th Fighter Squadron began to receive F-16C Block 32 aircraft in December 2006. All aircraft were replaced with Block 32 variants by the end of 2007.

The 144th Fighter Wing started the conversion process to F-15C Eagles from the 120th Fighter Wing of the Montana Air National Guard with the arrival of the first of 21 F-15s on 18 June 2013. The last F-16 departed the 144th Fighter Wing on 7 November 2013, destined for 162nd Fighter Wing.

Lineage
 Constituted as 372nd Fighter Group on 12 October 1943
 Activated on 28 October 1943
 Re-designated 372nd Fighter-Bomber Group in April 1944
 Re-designated 372nd Fighter Group in June 1944
 Inactivated on 7 November 1945
 Re-designated 144th Fighter Group and allotted to California ANG on 24 May 1946.
 Extended federal recognition and activated on 2 June 1948
 Established as 144th Fighter Wing and allotted to California ANG, 31 October 1950
 Organized and received federal recognition, 1 November 1950, assuming personnel and equipment of 61st Fighter Wing (Inactivated)
 144th Fighter Group assigned as subordinate unit
 Re-designated: 144th Fighter-Bomber Wing, 1 December 1952
 Group re-designated 144th Fighter-Bomber Group
 Re-designated: 144th Fighter-Interceptor Wing, 7 July 1955
 Group re-designated 144th Fighter-Interceptor Group
 144th Fighter-Interceptor Group inactivated 30 June 1974
 Re-designated: 144th Fighter Wing, 16 March 1992
 Group re-activated and re-designated 144th Operations Group

Assignments
 IV Fighter Command, 28 October 1943
 III Fighter Command, 29 March 1944 – 7 November 1945
 61st Fighter Wing, 2 June 1948
 California Air National Guard, 31 October 1950
 Gained by: Western Air Defense Force, Air Defense Command
 Gained by: San Francisco Air Defense Sector, Air Defense Command, 1 July 1960
 Gained by: 26th Air Division, Air Defense Command, 1 April 1966
 Gained by: 26th Air Division, Aerospace Defense Command, 1 January 1970
 Gained by: Air Defense, Tactical Air Command (ADTAC), 1 October 1979
 Gained by: First Air Force, Tactical Air Command, 9 December 1985
 Gained by: Northwest Air Defense Sector (NWADS), 1 July 1987
 Gained by: Western Air Defense Sector (WADS), 1 October 1997 – present

Components
 144th Operations Group, 16 March 1992 – Present
 407th Fighter Squadron: 15 October 1943 – 7 November 1945
 Re-designated: 191st Fighter (later Fighter-Bomber; Fighter-Interceptor) Squadron, 18 November 1946 – 1 July 1958 (Utah ANG)

 408th Fighter Squadron: 15 October 1943 – 7 November 1945
 Re-designated: 192nd Fighter (later Fighter-Bomber, Fighter-Interceptor) Squadron, 25 June 1948 – 19 April 1958 (Nevada ANG)

 409th Fighter Squadron: 15 October 1943 – 7 November 1945
 Re-designated: 194th Fighter (later Fighter-Interceptor, Fighter-Bomber, Fighter-Interceptor, Fighter) Squadron, 2 June 1948 – present

Stations

 Hamilton Field, California, 15 October 1943
 Portland Army Air Base, Oregon, 7 December 1943
 Esler Army Airfield, Louisiana, 25 March 1944
 Pollock Army Airfield, Louisiana, 15 April 1944
 Esler Army Airfield, Louisiana, 9 February 1945

 Alexandria Army Air Base, Louisiana, 14 Sep – 7 November 1945
 Naval Air Station Alameda, California, 25 June 1948
 Hayward Air National Guard Base, California, 1949
 Fresno Yosemite International Airport, California, 1957
 Designated: Fresno Air National Guard Base, California, 1991 – present
 Additional Alert Detachment at March Air Reserve Base, 1995 – present

Aircraft

 P-39 Airacobra, 1943–1944
 P-40 Warhawk, 1944–1945
 P-51D Mustang, 1945
 F-51D Mustang, 1948–1954
 F-86A Sabre, 1954–1958
 F-86L Sabre, 1958–1964

 F-102 Delta Dagger, 1965–1974
 F-106 Delta Dart, 1974–1983
 F-4D Phantom II, 1983–1989
 F-16A Fighting Falcon, 1989–1995
 F-16C/D Fighting Falcon, 1995 – 2013
 F-15C/D Eagle, 2013–present

References

 Maurer, Maurer (1983). Air Force Combat Units of World War II. Maxwell AFB, Alabama: Office of Air Force History. .
 Rogers, B. (2006). United States Air Force Unit Designations Since 1978. 
 Cornett, Lloyd H. and Johnson, Mildred W., A Handbook of Aerospace Defense Organization 1946 – 1980, Office of History, Aerospace Defense Center, Peterson AFB, CO (1980).
 144th Fighter Wing@globalsecurity.org
 144th Fighter Wing website history page

External links

 Official website of the 144th Fighter Wing

Military units and formations established in 1950
Wings of the United States Air National Guard
Military units and formations in California
144